Zélia Duncan (28 October 1964), born Zélia Cristina Gonçalves Moreira, is a Brazilian singer-songwriter.

Biography
Duncan was born in Niterói, in the state of Rio de Janeiro. She moved with her family to Brasília, where she lived for 16 years. She started her professional career in 1981 after she won a contest organized by the Fundação Nacional de Artes (National Foundation of Arts). When she was 22 years old, she returned to Rio. Using the name "Zélia Cristina", she first performed as a soloist in Botanic in Rio de Janeiro. In 1990 she launched the LP "Outra Luz" ("Another Light"), and she began performing in cities like São Paulo, Florianópolis, and Porto Alegre and participating in tv shows.

In late 1991, she accepted an offer to go play in the United Arab Emirates. She stayed there for 5 months, returning to Brazil in May 1992. It was in this year that she recorded a track in the songbook of Dorival Caymmi, and she also adopted the name Duncan, the maiden name of her mother. In 1994, she launched her first CD, Zélia Duncan, and two years later she recorded Intimidade (Intimacy), which made her spend a season in Europe and Japan.

In 2006, Duncan was invited to join the tour of the psychedelic rock band Os Mutantes, replacing Rita Lee as the vocalist. The tour was a success and Duncan became a full member of the band. In 2007, however, she decided to leave the band to continue her solo career. In 2008, she released a CD and DVD of the shows she performed with Simone Bittencourt de Oliveira in 2006 and 2007. The title of the CD and DVD was Amigo é a Casa (Friend is the House). Simone and Zélia performed shows in three Portuguese cities—Figueira da Foz, Oporto, and Lisbon.

In 2019, her album Tudo É Um was nominated for the Latin Grammy Award for Best MPB Album. Zélia's first performance with public presence during the pandemic of COVID-19, took place on November 28, 2020, at Sala São Paulo, in the São Paulo capital, together with Mart'nália. The performance was part of the series Historical Encounters, with the Jazz Sinfônica Orchestra and had all the care of distancing and other sanitary protocols.

Discography

1990 – Outra Luz
1994 – Zélia Duncan
1996 – Intimidade
1998 – Acesso
2001 – Sortimento
2002 – Sortimento Vivo
2003 – Avassaladora
2004 – Eu me Transformo em Outras
2005 – Pré-Pós-Tudo-Bossa-Band
2006 – Os Mutantes – Live in Barbican Theatre (with Os Mutantes)
2008 – Amigo é casa (live with Simone)
2009 – Pelo Sabor do Gesto2012 – Tudo Esclarecido''

References

External links
 Official website

1964 births
Lesbian musicians
Brazilian contraltos
Música Popular Brasileira singers
21st-century Brazilian women singers
21st-century Brazilian singers
Brazilian women composers
20th-century Brazilian women singers
20th-century Brazilian singers
Living people
Brazilian people of Scottish descent
People from Niterói
Brazilian LGBT singers
20th-century Brazilian LGBT people
21st-century Brazilian LGBT people
Brazilian women singer-songwriters
Women in Latin music
LGBT people in Latin music
Brazilian people of Irish descent
Os Mutantes members